Full Circle is the sixth album by American R&B group Boyz II Men. It was released by Arista Records on July 23, 2002 in the United States. Their first project with the label, following their departure from Motown Records and the release of previous album Nathan Michael Shawn Wanya through Universal Records, it features the singles "The Color of Love", written by Babyface and "Relax Your Mind" featuring Faith Evans, Full Circle was the last Boyz II Men album to include bass singer Michael McCary.

Critical reception

Full Circle received positive reviews from critics.  At Metacritic, which assigns a normalized rating out of 100 to reviews from mainstream critics, the album has an average score of 69 based on 14 reviews. Stephen Thomas Erlewine of AllMusic commented, "a little of the stilted, early-'80s funk-influenced hip-hop that marked modern soul, while offering a lot of adult contemporary balladry. Although the group doesn't delve too hard into funk, it still doesn't mesh particularly well together, especially since the material, while well-sung as ever, isn't particularly distinguished. That doesn't mean it's bad – the album is pleasant enough as it spins – but it's simply not that memorable, which is quite a disappointment after the very, very nice Nathan Michael Shawn Wanya."

Accolades
In February 2003, Boyz II Men were nominated for a Soul Train Music Award for R&B/Soul Album Group, Band or Duo for Full Circle.

Track listing

Sample credits
"Woman Don't Cry" contains replayed elements from "Lean On Me" (1972) as written and performed by Bill Withers.

Charts

Weekly charts

Year-end charts

Certifications

Release history

References

External links
 Boyz II Men Official website
 Boyz 2 men.org

2002 albums
Albums produced by Jimmy Jam and Terry Lewis
Albums produced by Scott Storch
Arista Records albums
Boyz II Men albums